Scriver is an occupational surname of German origin, which means a "scribe" or "writer." Alternative spellings include Schriver and Shriver. The name may refer to:

Charles Scriver (born 1930), Canadian pediatrician
Christian Scriver (1629–1693), German writer
Julius Scriver (1826–1907), Canadian politician
Robert Scriver (1914–1999), American sculptor

See also 
Schreiber (surname)
Schriver
Shriver

Germanic-language surnames
English-language surnames
Occupational surnames